St. Mark's Episcopal Church is a historic Episcopal church located at Huntersville, North Carolina. The church was built in 1886–1887, and is a small rural "English country Gothic" style brick church. It has a cross-shaped plan with a three-bay-long nave, a pair of small single-bay side wings, and a one-bay chancel. Also on the property is the wood-frame parsonage; a two-story L-shaped dwelling with a Victorian doorway and porch trim.  It was built about 1897.

It was listed on the National Register of Historic Places in 1984, with a boundary increase in 1991.

References

External links
UNCC source

Churches on the National Register of Historic Places in North Carolina
Gothic Revival church buildings in North Carolina
Churches completed in 1886
19th-century Episcopal church buildings
Churches in Mecklenburg County, North Carolina
National Register of Historic Places in Mecklenburg County, North Carolina